Gerhard Conrad may refer to:

 Gerhard Conrad (intelligence officer) (born 1954), agent of the Federal Intelligence Service, the foreign intelligence agency of Germany
 Gerhard Conrad (pilot) (1895–1982), Generalleutnant in the Luftwaffe during World War II